Punto Final was a biweekly news and political magazine published in Santiago, Chile. The magazine was in circulation between September 1965 and 9 March 2018.

History and profile
Punto Final was established in 1965. The first issue appeared in September 1965. The magazine was published on a fortnightly basis and had its headquarters in Santiago. It had a left-wing political stance and had close links to the Revolutionary Left Movement (Movimiento de Izquierda Revolucionario). The magazine announced that it had ceased publication following the issue 894 which was published on 9 March 2018.

References

External links
 

1965 establishments in Chile
2018 disestablishments in Chile
Biweekly magazines
Communist magazines
Defunct magazines published in Chile
Defunct political magazines
Magazines established in 1965
Magazines disestablished in 2018
Mass media in Santiago
News magazines published in South America
Political magazines published in Chile
Spanish-language magazines